Mountain House School District is a public school district based in Alameda County, California, United States.

External links
 

School districts in Alameda County, California